Edsbyns IF FF is a Swedish football club in Edsbyn in Ovanåker Municipality in Sweden.

Background
Edsbyns IF, founded on 6 June 1909, is a sports club in Edsbyn. The bandy section of the club was founded as late as in 1925 and in 2000 the section was formally made a club of its own.

Since their foundation Edsbyns IF FF has participated mainly in the middle and lower divisions of the Swedish football league system.  The club currently plays in Division 3 Södra Norrland which is the fifth tier of Swedish football. They play their home matches at the Öns IP in Edsbyn.

Edsbyns IF FF are affiliated to Hälsinglands Fotbollförbund.

Recent history
In recent seasons Edsbyns IF FF have competed in the following divisions:

2011 – Division III, Södra Norrland
2010 – Division IV, Hälsingland
2009 – Division IV, Hälsingland
2008 – Division IV, Hälsingland
2007 – Division IV, Hälsingland
2006 – Division III, Södra Norrland
2005 – Division III, Södra Norrland
2004 – Division IV, Hälsingland
2003 – Division IV, Hälsingland
2002 – Division IV, Hälsingland
2001 – Division III, Södra Norrland
2000 – Division III, Södra Norrland
1999 – Division II, Östra Svealand
1998 – Division III, Södra Norrland
1997 – Division IV, Hälsingland
1996 – Division IV, Hälsingland
1995 – Division IV, Hälsingland
1994 – Division IV, Hälsingland
1993 – Division V, Hälsingland

Attendances

In recent seasons Edsbyns IF FF have had the following average attendances:

Footnotes

External links
 Edsbyns IF FF – Official website
 Edsbyns IF FF on Facebook

Football clubs in Gävleborg County
Association football clubs established in 1909
1909 establishments in Sweden